Trancefer is the fourteenth album by Klaus Schulze. It was originally released in 1981, and in 2006 was the twenty-third Schulze album reissued by Revisited Records. With the original total running time of 37 minutes and 23 seconds, it was the shortest album in Schulze's canon until the 2006 reissue doubled its running time.

Overview
Trancefer features strong performances by Wolfgang Tiepold on cello and Michael Shrieve on percussion. Although it was his second album recorded with digital instruments, and has a great deal of treble, it is an example of the Berlin School genre which developed in the 1970s. The second track, "Silent Running", was inspired by the science fiction film Silent Running starring Bruce Dern. This was the third Schulze piece to be inspired by science fiction, following "Dune" (from Dune, 1979) and "The Andromeda Strain" (1976; first collected on Historic Edition, 1995).

Trancefer is quite distinctive in its sound and arrangements. It is quite different from what Schulze was doing in the 1970s in the sense that it is not a composition that uses sequencers, transpositions, and a main melody line. Trancefer is more syncopated, and here the main focus is put on the dialog between the percussion and the chords Schulze is playing on the Yamaha CS-80 synthesizer.

There is a pre-release of Trancefer, called "Trancefer half-speed cut", which consists of 300 copies at 45RPM normal cut, and 500 copies at 33RPM, the 'halfspeed' cut. The mix is different from the original album, and the main sequence is reminiscent of the one, which features in "Bellistique" on the ...Live... album, although this is more evident in the 'half-speed' cut, than the full release version.

Track listing
All tracks composed by Klaus Schulze.

References

External links
 Trancefer at the official site of Klaus Schulze
 

Klaus Schulze albums
1981 albums